Pachybrachis integratus is a species of case-bearing leaf beetle in the family Chrysomelidae.

References

Further reading

 

integratus
Articles created by Qbugbot
Beetles described in 1915